All Dressed Up and No Place to Go is the fourth studio album by American singer Nicolette Larson. It was produced by Andrew Gold and released by Warner Bros. Records in 1982.

Background
All Dressed Up and No Place to Go was produced by Andrew Gold, who at the time was in a serious relationship with Larson. The pair broke up shortly after the album's recording sessions had finished. In a circa 2005 interview for Randolph Michaels's book Flashbacks to Happiness: Eighties Music Revisited, Andrew Gold recalled of the album: "She and I had a blast making the record [and] we had some great players doing the album with us. To me, the album was one of her best, yet it was somehow overlooked by many of her fans."

The album's only single was "I Only Want to Be with You", a cover of the 1963 Dusty Springfield song. Larson's version was released in July 1982, and reached No. 53 on the Billboard Hot 100. It was Larson's last appearance on the chart. All Dressed Up and No Place to Go, released in July, peaked at No. 75 on the Billboard 200. It was her final release for Warner Bros.

The album received its first release on CD, in Japan only, during 1991. Wounded Bird Records later released a remastered CD version in the US in 2005, followed by a UK release from BGO Records in 2018.

Critical reception

Upon release, Billboard described the album as "more economical pop/rock" than Larson's earlier work, adding: "While she still flexes the laid-back charm of her earliest records, Larson's overall vocal attack is more urgent here. The results could restore broad radio acceptance for the singer." Cash Box felt the album was a "strong showing", with "laid-back love songs folk-rock listeners should relish". They added that the cover art acted as a "perfect metaphor for [Larson's] innocent, beguiling vocal manner".

J. D. Considine wrote in Musician: "If, like me, you believe that the lack of quality on a female vocalist's album is directly proportionate to the amount of clothing worn on the cover, be advised that on this one, Larson is wearing a towel."

In a retrospective review, Bruce Eder of AllMusic felt the album was Larson's attempt to "jump from country singer to pop diva", but "somehow it didn't take". He added: "The album isn't as strong as it might've been, and part of the problem involves the production, which mixes '80s-style electric drumming with country-pop sounds."

Track listing

Chart performance

Personnel
 Nicolette Larson - lead vocals (all tracks), backing vocals (tracks 1–6, 8)
 Andrew Gold - acoustic guitar (track 1), piano (tracks 1, 4, 6), percussion (tracks 1–6, 8–9), soloist (track 1), backing vocals (tracks 1–3, 5–6, 8), electric guitar (tracks 2, 5), slide guitar (tracks 4, 6), synthesizer (tracks 4, 6–9), keyboards (track 5), mandolin (track 7), harmony vocals (track 7), guitar (tracks 8–10)
 Fred Tackett - electric guitar (tracks 1, 4, 6–7), acoustic guitar (track 2), guitar (track 3)
 Mark Jordan - organ (track 1), electric piano (tracks 1, 3–4), keyboards (track 2), Wurtlitzer organ (track 6), piano (tracks 7–8)
 Scott Chambers - bass (tracks 1–4, 6–9)
 Rick Shlosser - drums (tracks 1–4, 6–9)
 Arno Lucas - congas (tracks 1, 3, 6, 9), timbales (track 1), tambourine (track 7)
 Andrew Kastner - guitar (track 3)
 Jim Horn - saxophone (tracks 4–5, 9)
 Bobby LaKind - congas (tracks 4, 6, 8)
 Julia Tillman, Maxine Willard - backing vocals (track 4)
 Valerie Carter - backing vocals (track 5)
 John McFee - electric guitar (track 5)
 Bob Glaub - bass (track 5)
 Michael Botts - drums (track 5)
 Billy Payne - synthesizer (tracks 6, 10), piano (track 10)
 Linda Ronstadt, Wendy Waldman - backing vocals (track 8)
 Lee Thornberg - trumpet (track 8)
 Richard Feldman - electric guitar (track 9)
 Patrick Henderson - electric piano (track 9)
 Maureen McDonald - backing vocals (track 9)

Production
 Andrew Gold - producer
 Jim Isaacson - engineer
 Steve McManus - second engineer
 Bobby Hata - mastering
 Ted Templeman - executive producer

Other
 Jodie Lunine - production co-ordinator
 Jimmy Wachtel - artwork design
 Randee St. Nicholas - photography
 Derek Sutton - management, direction

References

1982 albums
Nicolette Larson albums
Albums produced by Andrew Gold
Warner Records albums